Hugo Lopez (born June 16, 1987 in León, Nicaragua) is a Canadian football defensive back who is currently a free agent. He most recently played for the Montreal Alouettes of the Canadian Football League.

University football
He played CIS football with the Waterloo Warriors from 2007 to 2009 and with the Toronto Varsity Blues in 2010.

Professional football

Edmonton Eskimos
Lopez was drafted 14th overall in the 2011 CFL Draft by the Edmonton Eskimos and signed with the team on May 25, 2011. In his rookie season, Lopez played in 3 games, recording 2 special teams tackles.

In 2012, Lopez played in 7 games, recording 6 special teams tackles.

Toronto Argonauts
On July 23, 2013, Lopez signed with the Toronto Argonauts of the Canadian Football League. He was released by the Argonauts on November 7, 2013.

Saskatchewan Roughriders
On March 18, 2014, Lopez signed with the Saskatchewan Roughriders. He was released by the Roughriders on June 16, 2014.

Ottawa Redblacks
Lopez was signed by the Ottawa Redblacks on August 19, 2014. He played in 17 games over two seasons with the Redblacks, accumulating five special teams tackles. He was released on September 16, 2015.

Saskatchewan Roughriders
On On November 4, 2015, Lopez re-signed with the Saskatchewan Roughriders. He played in the team's last game of the regular season and was released by the Roughriders on December 15, 2015.

Montreal Alouettes
On August 23, 2016, Lopez signed with the Montreal Alouettes. He dressed in two games before being released on September 6, 2016.

References

External links
CFL bio
Ottawa Redblacks bio 

1987 births
Living people
Canadian football defensive backs
Edmonton Elks players
Sportspeople from León, Nicaragua
Ottawa Redblacks players
Montreal Alouettes players
Saskatchewan Roughriders players
Toronto Varsity Blues football players
Waterloo Warriors football players
Nicaraguan sportspeople